Swenoda Lake is a lake in Pope County, in the U.S. state of Minnesota.

Swenoda is a portmanteau of Swedish, Norwegian, and Danish, commemorating the nationalities of the pioneers who first settled in the area.

See also
List of lakes in Minnesota

References

Lakes of Minnesota
Lakes of Pope County, Minnesota